Loonatheworld Tour, also known as 2022 LOONA 1st World Tour : [LOONATHEWORLD] was the first worldwide concert tour by the South Korean girl group Loona. This marked the group's first-ever world tour and concerts outside of Seoul since their debut in 2018. The tour began in Los Angeles on August 1, 2022.

Background 
On May 31, 2022, Blockberry Creative announced Loona's first tour in the United States. (The original announcement only had 9 shows compared to the now 14 shows.) On June 3, it was announced a second date was added to the Los Angeles show. The following day, tickets went on sale for the 10 dates and Blockberry Creative and MyMusicTaste announced that member Chuu would be unable to participate in the world tour due to pre-scheduled activities. On June 15, four more locations were added and tickets would go on sale the next day. On July 27, the European leg of the tour was unveiled. It was announced that Choerry will not be participating in the European leg of the tour due to health issues. The tour started in Warsaw on September 6 and continue to Amsterdam, Frankfurt, Paris, before concluding in London. On September 17, two concerts were added for Seoul on October 15–16. BlockBerry Creative announced that Chuu will be sitting out on the Seoul dates due to scheduling conflicts.

Setlist 

 "#"
 "So What"
 "Heat"
 "Star"
 "Butterfly"
 "One Way"
 "You and Me Together"
 "My Melody"
 "Loonatic"
 "Stylish"
 "Dance On My Own"
 "Pale Blue Dot"
 "Flip That"
 "Wow"
 "Pose"
 "Why Not?"
 "PTT (Paint the Town)"
Encore
 "Hi High"
"Day & Night" †
"Oh (Yes I Am)" †

† Only featured on Kansas City, London and Reading's setlist.

† Only featured on Washington's setlist.

Tour dates

References 

2022 concert tours
Concert tours of the United States
Concert tours of Mexico
Concert tours of the Netherlands
Concert tours of Germany
Concert tours of France
Concert tours of the United Kingdom
August 2022 events in the United States
August 2022 events in Mexico
September 2022 events in Germany
September 2022 events in France
September 2022 events in the United Kingdom
October 2022 events in South Korea
Loona (group)